Mabuhay is a Tagalog greeting, usually expressed as Mabuhay!, in the imperative form of life, thus, Live!, from the root word buhay (life).

Mabuhay may also refer to:
 The Mabuhay Channel, a former Filipino language channel that broadcast to Filipinos abroad
 Mabuhay Gardens, a San Francisco nightclub
 Mabuhay Satellite Corporation, a former Filipino aerospace corporation 
 Mabuhay Singers, a group of singers from the Philippines that was formed in 1958
 Mabuhay, Zamboanga Sibugay, a municipality in the province of Zamboanga Sibugay, Philippines
 Mabuhay (magazine), inflight magazine of Philippines Airlines
 Mabuhay Lounge, the airport lounge for Philippines Airlines